The Morrison Formation is a distinctive sequence of Upper Jurassic sedimentary rock that is found in the western United States, which has been the most fertile source of dinosaur fossils in North America. It is composed of mudstone, sandstone, siltstone and limestone and is light grey, greenish gray, or red. Most of the fossils occur in the green siltstone beds and lower sandstones, relics of the rivers and floodplains of the Jurassic period.

Fauna comparisons
The fauna of Morrison Formation is similar to one in the coeval rocks of Tendaguru Beds (in Tanzania) and Lourinhã Formation in Portugal, mostly with the second. Some genera are shared in Morrison and Lourinhã, such as Torvosaurus, Ceratosaurus, Stegosaurus, Dryosaurus, and Allosaurus.
In sum, Morrison Fm has 37 valid genera of dinosaurs.

Ornithischians
The herbivorous ornithischian dinosaurs were diverse but not as common as sauropods in the Morrison. Fruitadens, previously known as the "Fruita Echinodon", was found to be a heterodontosaurid. Plate-backed stegosaurids included Hesperosaurus mjosi, Stegosaurus armatus, S. ungulatus, S. stenops, and Alcovasaurus longispinus.  Armored dinosaurs that weren't stegosaurs were unknown in the formation until the 1990s.  Two have been named: Gargoyleosaurus parkpinorum and Mymoorapelta maysi.  Ornithopods, bipedal herbivores, came in several types. Small "hypsilophodonts" included Drinker nisti, Laosaurus celer, "L." gracilis, Nanosaurus agilis, Othnielia rex, and Othnielosaurus consors (all of which are now synonymous with Nanosaurus). Larger but similar-looking dryosaurids were represented by two species of Dryosaurus (D. altus and D. elderae) and the camptosaurid Uteodon aphanoecetes, which is currently known only from Dinosaur National Monument. Still larger was the more common Camptosaurus dispar.  Dryosaurids and camptosaurids were early iguanodonts, a group that would later spawn the duck-billed dinosaurs.

Neornithischians

Thyreophorans

Misc

Sauropods
Sauropods, the giant long-necked long-tailed four-legged herbivorous dinosaurs, are among the most common and famous Morrison fossils. A few have uncertain relationships, like "Apatosaurus" minimus (possibly a basal titanosauriform) and Haplocanthosaurus. Sauropods including Haplocanthosaurus priscus, H. delfsi, and the diplodocid Eobrontosaurus appeared in the early stages of the Morrison. The middle stages were dominated by familiar forms such as the Giraffe-like Brachiosaurus altithorax, which were uncommon, but related camarasaurids, like Camarasaurus supremus, C. grandis, C. lentus, and Cathetosaurus, were very common. Also common were long, low diplodocids, like Apatosaurus ajax, A. louisae, Brontosaurus excelsus, B. parvus, Barosaurus lentus, Diplodocus longus, D. carnegii, Galeamopus and Dyslocosaurus polyonychius.

By the late Morrison, gigantic diplodocids (or likely diplodocids) had appeared, including Diplodocus hallorum (formerly Seismosaurus), Supersaurus vivianae, Amphicoelias altus, and M. fragilimus. Smaller sauropods, such as Suuwassea emiliae from Montana, tend to be found in the northern reaches of the Morrison, near the shores of the ancient Sundance Sea, suggesting ecological niches favoring smaller body size there compared with the giants found further south.

Haplocanthosaurids

Rebbachisaurids

Dicraeosaurids

{| class="wikitable" align="center" width="100%"
|- 
! Genus
! Species
! Locality
! width="20%"| Material
! width="30%"| Notes
! Images
|-
| 
Dyslocosaurus
|   
D. polyonychius
|
Wyoming
|A fragmentary forelimb and partial hindlimbs.
|Phylogenetic placement is uncertain.
|
|-
|  
Smitanosaurus
|   
S. agilis
| 
Colorado, Brushy Basin member
|
"Partial skull and cervicals."
|
A dicraeosaurid sauropod. Originally described as "Morosaurus" agilis.
|-
| Suuwassea|   S. emilieae|
Montana, Brushy Basin member
|A partial skull and some postcrania.
|
A dicraeosaurid about 15m in length.
|
|-
|}

Diplodocids

Macronarians

Theropods
Theropod dinosaurs, the carnivorous dinosaurs, came in several different types. The less derived types, the ceratosaurs and megalosaurids, included Ceratosaurus nasicornis, C. dentisulcatus, C. magnicornis, Elaphrosaurus sp., and the megalosaur Torvosaurus tanneri (including Edmarka rex). Allosaurids included the common Allosaurus fragilis (including Epanterias amplexus), Allosaurus new species, A. lucasi, and giant Saurophaganax maximus (potentially included in Allosaurus?).

Indeterminate theropod remains have been recovered in Utah. Indeterminate theropod tracks have been recovered from both Utah and Arizona.

Allosauroidea

Ceratosaurs

Coelurosaurs
Coelurosaurs, are the group of theropods closely related to birds, included Coelurus fragilis, Ornitholestes hermanni, Tanycolagreus topwilsoni, the possible troodontid Koparion douglassi, the definite troodontid Hesperornithoides, and the early tyrannosauroid Stokesosaurus clevelandi.

Megalosauroids

Eggs
Dinosaur eggs have been found in Utah.

Tracks

Ornithopods
Morrison ornithopod trace fossils are represented by three toed tracks which are generally small. The toes of Morrison ornithopod tracks are usually more widely splayed than the theropod tracks preserved in the formation.

Stegosaurs
Stegosaur tracks were first recognized in 1996 from a hindprint-only trackway discovered at the Clevland-Lloyd quarry, which is located near Price, Utah. Two years later, a new ichnogenus called Stegopodus was erected for another set of stegosaur tracks which were found near Arches National Park, also in Utah. Unlike the first, this trackway preserved traces of the forefeet. Fossil remains indicate that stegosaurs have five digits on the forefeet and three weight-bearing digits on the hind feet. From this, scientists were able to successfully predict the appearance of stegosaur tracks in 1990, six years in advance of the first actual discovery of Morrison stegosaur tracks. Since the erection of Stegopodus, more trackways have been found, however none have preserved traces of the front feet, and stegosaur traces remain rare.

Theropods
Indeterminate theropod tracks have been recovered from both Utah and Arizona.

Footnotes

References
 Butler, R.J., P.M. Galton, L.B. Porro, L.M. Chiappe, D.M. Henderson, and G.M. Erickson. 2009. Lower limits of ornithischian dinosaur body size inferred from a new Upper Jurassic heterodontosaurid from North America. Proceedings of the Royal Society B 10.1098/rspb.2009.1494 PDF
 "Camarasaurus." In: Dodson, Peter & Britt, Brooks & Carpenter, Kenneth & Forster, Catherine A. & Gillette, David D. & Norell, Mark A. & Olshevsky, George & Parrish, J. Michael & Weishampel, David B. The Age of Dinosaurs. Publications International, LTD. p. 56. .
 
 Carpenter, K. and Wilson, Y. 2008. A new species of  Camptosaurus (Ornithopoda: Dinosauria) from the Morrison Formation (Upper Jurassic) of Dinosaur National Monument, Utah, and a biomechanical analysis of its forelimb. Annals of the Carnegie Museum 76:227-263.
 
 Foster, J. (2007). Jurassic West: The Dinosaurs of the Morrison Formation and Their World. Indiana University Press. 389pp. .
 Galton, P.M. (1981). Dryosaurus'', a hypsilophodontid dinosaur from the Upper Jurassic of North America and Africa. Postcranial skeleton. Palaeontol. Z. 55(3/4), 271-312
 Weishampel, David B.; Dodson, Peter; and Osmólska, Halszka (eds.): The Dinosauria, 2nd, Berkeley: University of California Press. 861 pp. .

 01
Morrison Formation
.
Jurassic United States
Paleontology in Colorado
Paleontology in Utah
Dinosaur National Monument